Cyperus pallidicolor, commonly known as the pallid flatsedge, is a species of sedge that is native to southern parts of North America, parts of Central America and northern parts of South America.

See also
List of Cyperus species

References

pallidicolor
Plants described in 1993
Flora of Mexico
Flora of Arizona
Flora of Bolivia
Flora of Colombia
Flora of Guatemala
Flora of Peru